Neuroxena fulleri is a moth of the subfamily Arctiinae first described by Herbert Druce in 1883. It is found in Cameroon, Equatorial Guinea, Gabon and Nigeria.

References

 

Nyctemerina